Harald Ertl (31 August 1948 – 7 April 1982) was an Austrian racing driver and motorsport journalist. He was born in Zell am See and attended the same school as Grand Prix drivers Jochen Rindt, Helmut Marko and Niki Lauda.

Ertl sported an 'Imperial'-style moustache and full beard. He worked his way through the German Formula Vee and Super Vee, and then on to Formula Three, before a successful switch to Touring Cars. During this period, he gained sufficient sponsorship to enter Formula One, where he drove with various outfits between 1975 and 1980. Ertl was one of the four drivers who helped to get Niki Lauda out of his burning Ferrari in the 1976 German Grand Prix.

Ertl was killed in an aeroplane crash in 1982, when the small plane he was travelling in suffered from engine failure.

Early racing career
In 1969, he bought a Formula V car (Austro Vau), won six races, but also rolled it at the Nürburgring. He was second in the European Cup with a Kaimann chassis in 1970, and started also in a round of the Championnat de France with a March-Ford 703, at Aéroport Dijon-Longvic circuit. He continued with F3 the following season, undertaking a selection of races in England, best result being ninth at Brands Hatch.

In 1971, he also moved to the European Touring Car Championship, driving an Alfa Romeo, gaining a third place at Monza in the Monza 4 hours. For 1972, he switched to the BMW-Alpina team in the Deutsche Rennsport Meisterschaft. The best result of the season, with a fourth place in the first race, Internationale ADAC-Eifelrennen, held on the Nürburgring Nordschleife.

1973 saw Ertl continue to mix Formula Three and Touring Cars, with little success, until the September, when at the side of Derek Bell, they would win the RAC Tourist Trophy, with both drivers each winning their respective heat, to take an aggregate victory.

For 1974, his main target was the Deutsche Formel 3 Polifac Trophy. Once again, his best result came at the Nürburgring, where finished fourth. Meanwhile, he also raced in the Formal Super Vee Gold Pokal, taking 19th in the final standings. During this season, Ertl made his F2 debut, racing at both the  European Championship for F2 Drivers events at Hockenheim.

In 1975 Ertl signed for Fred Opert Racing to continue racing in F2. By the third race for the team he was on the podium. A third place in the Internationales ADAC-Eifelrennen, held on the Nürburgring Nordschleife enabled him gather enough money together, including sponsorship from Warsteiner to start racing in F1.

F1 career
In 1975, sponsorship obtained from Warsteiner had allowed him to drive a Hesketh 308 in Formula One, prepared by Hesketh Racing in Warsteiner's golden livery. In his debut at the German Grand Prix, he finished 8th. He went on to retire in his home GP, then finished ninth at Monza.

Encouraged by these results, a full season with Hesketh was planned for 1976. In the South African Grand Prix he qualified in the last row and finished 15th. The next races saw him either not qualify at all, or at the back of the grid, with early retirements due to mechanical failures. Despite not being satisfied with the value the team gave him for the money, he almost scored a point when coming in seventh at the 1976 British Grand Prix, albeit three laps down.

Two weeks later at the 1976 German Grand Prix, Ertl was one of the four drivers who helped pull Niki Lauda from his burning Ferrari after Lauda's infamous crash during the second lap of the race. The rest of the season saw two more eighth places finishes as highlights, at home and at the wet Japanese Grand Prix.

Ertl continued with Hesketh for a third season, taking in some European races, finishing 9th at the 1977 Belgian Grand Prix. He left Hesketh after the 1977 French Grand Prix where he again failed to qualify for the race.

For a few races in 1978, Ertl entered with Ensign, but things were even worse there, with the cars failing to finish or even worst, when he did not survive prequalifying at Monza. At the same event, he got another chance with the spare car of German-language ATS team, as regular driver Jochen Mass injured himself in the pre-Monza test a few days prior. He still failed to make the cut.

Two years later, Ertl tried once again with ATS in the 1980 German Grand Prix with the same result. The last Formula One Grand Prix he took part in was the 1978 Austrian Grand Prix, in his home country.

While not racing F1, Ertl was still racing in F2 albeit with very little success. In these three seasons, he finished just once in the top six.

DRM years
Away from single-seaters, Ertl returned to Deutsche Rennsport Meisterschaft (DRM) in 1977, now that the series had switched to Group 5.

Based on experience with their BMW, Schnitzer Motorsport developed a Toyota Celica LB Turbo for Ertl in 1977. Schnitzer switched back to BMW for the 1978 season, retaining the services for Ertl. This move made him one of the main contenders for the title. With the Kremer Racing Porsche of Bob Wollek being bit off the pace, while the Ford entrant, Zakspeed’s Escort being outdated, and their Ford Capri Turbo was unreliable. Ertl would win five of the 11 races during the season, with a second place at the season finale, a Super Sprint event at the Nürburgring, he would win the championship.

Despite taking the title with Schnitzer, Ertl switched to Zakspeed for the next two seasons. 1979 started off promising with a win in the opening round at Zolder, then followed it up with a third in Hockenheim in the next race. Although he would win once more at Mainz-Finthen, the season turned miserable with six non-finishes or non-starts out of 11 races, in Zakspeed’s Ford Capri Turbo. Meanwhile, Zakspeed also developed a mid-engined Lotus Europa for the 1000km Nürburgring. That also did not finish the race. The following season was like the previous one, when Ertl continued to be unlucky: 8 poles, 4 wins and 6 retirements.

Death

Ertl did not race internationally at all in 1981, but planned a return for the 1982 Renault 5 Turbo Cup.  However before these plans came through, he was killed in an aircraft accident at the age of 33. He was travelling in a Beechcraft Bonanza flown by his brother-in-law Jörg Becker-Hohensee from Mannheim to their holiday home in Sylt in Northern Germany for an Easter vacation. Less than a quarter of the way through the intended flight distance engine failure caused the plane to crash at Hohenahr near Giessen. Ertl's wife Vera and son Sebastian were injured but Becker-Hohensee, Ertl and his niece were killed.

Racing record

Career highlights

Complete Formula One World Championship results
(key) 

*  Ertl had failed to pre-qualify for this race in his Ensign, then took part in qualifying sessions in the ATS, and again failed to qualify.

Complete European Formula Two Championship results
(key) (Races in bold indicate pole position; races in italics'' indicate fastest lap)

Complete British Saloon Car Championship results
(key) (Races in bold indicate pole position; races in italics indicate fastest lap.)

External links
 Webpage with many photos (archived)
 F1 results (archived)
 Ertl's first Formula V race car

References 

1948 births
1982 deaths
ATS Wheels Formula One drivers
Austrian racing drivers
Austrian Formula One drivers
European Formula Two Championship drivers
Hesketh Formula One drivers
People from Zell am See
Sportspeople from Salzburg (state)
Victims of aviation accidents or incidents in Germany
Victims of aviation accidents or incidents in 1982
Schnitzer Motorsport drivers